Risk and compliance may refer to:

Legal governance, risk management, and compliance
Governance, risk management, and compliance
Internal audit